Iordanis Papargyriou (born 15 May 1992) is a Greek professional footballer who plays as a left-back for Gamma Ethniki club Kozani.

References

1992 births
Living people
Greek footballers
Super League Greece players
Football League (Greece) players
Super League Greece 2 players
Gamma Ethniki players
Kavala F.C. players
Anagennisi Karditsa F.C. players
Trikala F.C. players
PAS Lamia 1964 players
Doxa Drama F.C. players
Kozani F.C. players
Association football defenders
Footballers from Thessaloniki